This is a list of reptile species found in Sumatra, Indonesia.

Order Crocodilia

Family Crocodylidae
Crocodylus porosus

Family Gavialidae
Tomistoma schlegelii

Order Testudines

Family Geoemydidae

Batagur affinis
Batagur borneoensis
Cuora amboinensis
Cyclemys dentata
Cyclemys enigmatica
Heosemys spinosa
Notochelys platynota
Orlitia borneensis
Siebenrockiella crassicollis

Family Testudinidae

Manouria emys

Family Trionychidae

Amyda cartilaginea
Chitra chitra
Dogania subplana 
Pelochelys cantorii

Order Squamata

Suborder Lacertilia

Family Agamidae

Acanthosaura armata
Aphaniotis acutirostris
Aphaniotis fusca
Bronchocela cristatella
Bronchocela hayeki
Calotes versicolor
Dendragama australis
Dendragama boulengeri
Dendragama dioidema
Draco cornutus
Draco fimbriatus
Draco haematopogon
Draco lineatus (Mentawai Islands)
Draco maximus
Draco melanopogon
Draco modiglianii
Draco obscurus
Draco quinquefasciatus
Draco sumatranus
Draco volans
Gonocephalus beyschlagi
Gonocephalus chamaeleontinus
Gonocephalus grandis
Gonocephalus klossi
Gonocephalus kuhlii
Gonocephalus lacunosus
Gonocephalus liogaster
Gonocephalus megalepis
Harpesaurus beccarii
Harpesaurus ensicauda (Nias)
Harpesaurus modiglianii
Hypsicalotes kinabaluensis
Leiolepis belliana
Lophocalotes achlios
Lophocalotes ludekingi
Phoxophrys tuberculata
Pseudocalotes baliomus
Pseudocalotes cybelidermus
Pseudocalotes guttalineatus
Pseudocalotes rhammanotus
Pseudocalotes tympanistriga
Pseudocophotis sumatrana
Thaumatorhynchus brooksi

Family Anguidae
Dopasia wegneri

Family Dibamidae
Dibamus alfredi (Nias, Mentawai Isl.)
Dibamus dezwaani (Nias)
Dibamus leucurus
Dibamus tebal (Simeulue, Mentawai Isl.)

Family Eublepharidae

Aeluroscalabotes felinus

Family Lacertidae
Takydromus sexlineatus

Family Gekkonidae

Cnemaspis aceh
Cnemaspis andalas
Cnemaspis dezwaani
Cnemaspis jacobsoni (Simeulue, Mentawai Isl.)
Cnemaspis minang
Cnemaspis modiglianii (Enggano, Mentawai Isl.)
Cnemaspis pagai
Cnemaspis purnamai (Belitung)
Cnemaspis rajabasa
Cnemaspis tapanuli
Cnemaspis whittenorum (Mentawai Isl.)
Cyrtodactylus agamensis
Cyrtodactylus consobrinus (Singkep)
Cyrtodactylus lateralis
Cyrtodactylus marmoratus
Cyrtodactylus psarops
Cyrtodactylus quadrivirgatus
Cyrtodactylus semicinctus
Gehyra mutilata
Gekko gecko
Gekko monarchus
Gekko smithii
Hemidactylus craspedotus
Hemidactylus frenatus
Hemidactylus garnotii
Hemidactylus platyurus
Hemiphyllodactylus engganoensis
Hemiphyllodactylus margarethae
Hemiphyllodactylus typus
Luperosaurus brooksii
Ptychozoon horsfieldii
Ptychozoon kuhli

Family Scincidae

Dasia grisea
Dasia olivacea
Emoia atrocostata
Eutropis multifasciata
Eutropis rudis
Eutropis rugifera
Larutia sumatrensis
Lipinia relicta
Lipinia vittigera
Lygosoma bampfyldei
Lygosoma opisthorhodum
Lygosoma quadrupes
Lygosoma samajaya
Sphenomorphus anomalopus
Sphenomorphus cyanolaemus
Sphenomorphus malayanum
Sphenomorphus modigliani
Sphenomorphus sanctus
Sphenomorphus scotophilus
Subdoluseps bowringii
Tytthoscincus temmincki

Family Varanidae

Varanus dumerilii
Varanus nebulosus
Varanus rudicollis
Varanus salvator

Suborder Serpentes

Family Acrochordidae

Acrochordus granulatus
Acrochordus javanicus

Family Anomochilidae
Anomochilus weberi

Family Colubridae

Ahaetulla fasciolata
Ahaetulla mycterizans
Ahaetulla prasina
Anoplohydrus aemulans
Boiga bengkuluensis
Boiga cynodon
Boiga dendrophila
Boiga drapiezii
Boiga jaspidea
Boiga multomaculata
Boiga nigriceps
Calamaria abstrusa
Calamaria albiventer
Calamaria alidae
Calamaria crassa
Calamaria doederleini
Calamaria eiselti
Calamaria forcarti
Calamaria leucogaster
Calamaria lumbricoidea
Calamaria margaritophora
Calamaria mecheli
Calamaria modesta
Calamaria schlegeli
Calamaria sumatrana
Calamaria ulmeri
Calamaria virgulata
Chrysopelea ornata
Chrysopelea paradisi
Chrysopelea pelias
Coelognathus flavolineatus
Coelognathus radiatus
Dendrelaphis caudolineatus
Dendrelaphis formosus
Dendrelaphis haasi
Dendrelaphis kopsteini
Dendrelaphis pictus
Dendrelaphis striatus
Dryophiops rubescens
Elapoidis fusca
Etheridgeum pulchrum
Fowlea melanzostus
Gongylosoma baliodeirus
Gongylosoma longicaudum
Gonyosoma oxycephalum
Hebius inas
Hebius kerinciense
Hebius petersii
Hebius viperinus
Iguanognathus werneri
Liopeltis tricolor
Lycodon albofuscus
Lycodon capucinus
Lycodon effraenis
Lycodon sidiki
Lycodon subannulatus
Lycodon subcinctus
Oligodon ancorus
Oligodon annulifer
Oligodon bitorquatus
Oligodon octolineatus
Oligodon petronellae
Oligodon praefrontalis
Oligodon pulcherrimus
Oligodon purpurascens
Oligodon signatus
Oligodon trilineatus
Oligodon wagneri
Opisthotropis rugosa
Oreocryptophis porphyraceus
Orthriophis taeniurus
Pseudorabdion eiselti
Pseudorabdion longiceps
Pseudorabdion modiglianii
Pseudorabdion sirambense
Pseudoxenodon inornatus
Ptyas carinata
Ptyas fusca
Ptyas korros
Ptyas mucosa
Rhabdophis akraios
Rhabdophis chrysargos
Rhabdophis conspicillatus
Rhabdophis flaviceps
Rhabdophis rhodomelas
Rhabdophis subminiatus
Sibynophis geminatus
Sibynophis melanocephalus
Xenelaphis ellipsifer
Xenelaphis hexagonotus
Xenochrophis maculatus
Xenochrophis trianguligerus
Xenochrophis vittatus
Xenodermus javanicus

Family Cylindrophiidae
Cylindrophis ruffus

Family Elapidae

Aipysurus eydouxii
Bungarus candidus
Bungarus fasciatus
Bungarus flaviceps
Calliophis bivirgatus
Calliophis gracilis
Calliophis intestinalis
Hydrophis brookii
Hydrophis fasciatus
Hydrophis klossi
Hydrophis torquatus
Hydrophis viperinus
Laticauda colubrina
Naja sumatrana
Ophiophagus hannah
Thalassophis anomalus

Family Homalopsidae
Cantoria violacea
Cerberus rynchops
Cerberus schneiderii
Enhydris enhydris
Fordonia leucobalia
Homalopsis buccata
Hypsiscopus plumbea
Karnsophis siantaris
Miralia alternans
Phytolopsis punctata
Sumatranus albomaculata

Family Lamprophiidae
Psammodynastes pictus
Psammodynastes pulverulentus

Family Pareidae
Aplopeltura boa
Asthenodipsas laevis
Asthenodipsas malaccanus
Asthenodipsas tropidonotus
Asthenodipsas vertebralis
Pareas carinatus

Family Pythonidae
Python brongersmai
Python curtus
Python reticulatus

Family Typhlopidae
Argyrophis diardii
Argyrophis hypsobothrius
Argyrophis muelleri
Indotyphlops braminus
Ramphotyphlops lineatus

Family Viperidae
Ovophis monticola
Trimeresurus albolabris
Trimeresurus andalasensis
Trimeresurus brongersmai
Trimeresurus gunaleni
Trimeresurus hageni
Trimeresurus popeiorum
Trimeresurus puniceus
Trimeresurus purpureomaculatus
Trimeresurus sabahi
Trimeresurus sumatranus
Tropidolaemus wagleri

Family Xenopeltidae
Xenopeltis unicolor

References
Kurniati, Hellen (2007). Biodiversity and natural history of amphibians and reptiles in Kerinci Seblat National Park, Sumatra, Indonesia (2005, 2006, 2007). Jakarta: Research Center for Biology, Lembaga Ilmu Pengetahuan Indonesia (LIPI)
Kurniawan N, Firdaus AS, Nugraha FAD et al. (2017) Fishermen’s Perspective on Herpetofauna: A Case Study from Kuala Tungkal, Tanjung Jabung Barat, Jambi J. Trop. Life. Science 8 (1): 1 – 5.
Teynié A, David P, Ohler A. (2010). Note On A Collection Of Amphibians And Reptiles From Western Sumatra (Indonesia), With The Description Of A New Species Of The Genus Bufo. Zootaxa. 1-43. [10.5281/zenodo.194395]. 

Fauna of Sumatra
Reptiles of Indonesia
Sumatra